Persicaria sagittata, common names American tearthumb, arrowleaf tearthumb, or arrowvine, is a plant species widespread in the eastern half of North America as well as in eastern Asia. It has been found in every state and province from Texas to Manitoba to Newfoundland to Florida, plus Colorado and Oregon. It also grows in China, the Russian Far East, Siberia, Korea, Japan, northern India and Mongolia. It grows in moist areas along lake shores, stream banks, etc.

Persicaria sagittata is an annual herb up to 200 cm (80 inches) tall, with prickles along the stem. Leaves are up to 10 cm (4 inches) long, heart-shaped or arrowhead-shaped (unusual for the genus). Flowers are white to pink, borne in spherical to elongated clusters up to 15 mm (0.6 inches) long.

References

sagittata
Flora of North America
Plants described in 1753
Taxa named by Carl Linnaeus
Flora of Asia